Inedible to Incredible is an American reality television series which follows chef John Besh as he travels around the country to help improve horrible homemade meals. The series aired on TLC from June 21 to July 12, 2010 and was directed by Ian Stevenson.

Episodes

References

External links

2010 American television series debuts
2010 American television series endings
2010s American reality television series
Food reality television series
TLC (TV network) original programming
English-language television shows